Grace Neville (1898–1973) was an American screenwriter.

Biography 
Grace Neville was born in Chattanooga, Tennessee, to Benjamin Neville and Helen Turnell. She was added to the scenario department at Columbia Pictures in 1935. She later served as an officer in the Hollywood Studio Club, which aimed to prepare women for careers in the film industry. Neville — who never married — died in West Hollywood, where she resided, in 1973.

Selected filmography
Little Miss Roughneck (1938)
All American Sweetheart (1937)
 Counsel for Crime (1937)
The Game That Kills (1937)
 Motor Madness (1937)
 Find the Witness (1937)
Shakedown (1936)
Dangerous Intrigue (1936)
Air Hawks (1935)

References

Bibliography
Larry Langman & Daniel Finn. A Guide to American Crime Films of the Thirties. Greenwood Press, 1995.

External links

1898 births
1973 deaths
People from Chattanooga, Tennessee
Screenwriters from Tennessee
American women screenwriters
20th-century American women writers
20th-century American screenwriters